Charles Anthony Bayha (May 12, 1891 – February 28, 1957) was an American lyricist and composer during World War I.

Biography
He was born on 12 May 1891 in Brooklyn, New York City. He married Emma Mary Howard
(1895-?) on June 30, 1919, in Barnesville, Ohio. They had a son, Jack Elliott Bayha
(1920-1996). He joined ASCAP in 1920. He died on February 28, 1957, in Manhattan, New York City. He was buried on March 4, 1957, in Rosedale and Rosehill Cemetery  in Linden, New Jersey.

Compositions
He wrote and composed several wartime songs including, Every Girlie Loves a Soldier, I'd Be Proud to Be the Mother of a Soldier, If We Had a Million More Like Teddy, I'm In the Army Now, Let's Be Ready, That's the Spirit of '76, Neal of the Navy, Sail on, Victorious, Unseen, Sail!, and Since the Boys Came Home from France.

References

External links

American male songwriters
1891 births
1957 deaths
Broadway composers and lyricists
20th-century male musicians